Homalictus is a subgenus of bees in the genus Lasioglossum subfamily Halictinae of the family Halictidae. They are found in Sri Lanka, Southeast Asia, east across the Pacific to the Mariana Islands, Samoa, Fiji and are most prevalent in Australia.

Homalictus is sometimes regarded to be a full genus, but studies have shown that Homalictus and Lasioglossum form a monophyletic group.

Species 
The subgenus Lasioglossum (Homalictus) contains over 150 species including the following (list incomplete):

References

Halictidae
Insects described in 1919
Insect subgenera